Mandola may refer to:
 Mandola, a fretted, stringed musical instrument
 Mandola (painting), a 1910 oil painting by French artist Georges Braque
 Mandola (leafhopper), a leafhopper genus in the tribe Erythroneurini
 Mandola (candy), a sugar or honey-coated almond candy peculiar to the island of Kefalonia in Greece

See also
 Mandora (disambiguation)
 Special:Search/Mandore*